Polaskia (named after American amateur Charles Polaski) is a genus of tree-like cacti reaching 4–5 m high, comprising 2 species. Both present primitive characteristics, but Polaskia chichipe is nearer to Myrtillocactus while Polaskia chende is nearer to Stenocereus. The genus is found in the Mexican states of Puebla and Oaxaca.

Description
The tree-like, highly branched species of the Polaskia genus reach heights of growth of between 4 and 5 meters and form dense crowns 3 to 4 meters above the ground. Its bright green shoots repeatedly fork and grow 1 to 2 meters long. The 7 to 12 ribs are sharply triangular in cross-section. On their edges, these wear 3 to 4 millimeters wide, shield-shaped areoles at close intervals. The central spine may be absent. The 3 to 8 radial spines are greyish to blackish.

The urn- to bell-shaped flowers are white to creamy white to yellowish green. They open day and night and are between 4 and 6 centimeters long.

The red, spherical fruits with a diameter of 2 to 4 centimeters are juicy and edible. The small seeds it contains are pear- to ovoid-shaped and dull black.

Synonymy
The following genera have been brought into synonymy with Polaskia: 
Chichipia Backeb. (nom. inval.)
Heliabravoa Backeb.

Extant Species
Species as of 2021:

References

External links

Echinocereeae
Cacti of Mexico
Endemic flora of Mexico
Flora of Oaxaca
Flora of Puebla
Cactoideae genera